Nanaspididae is a family of copepods belonging to the order Siphonostomatoida.

Genera:
 Allantogynus Changeux, 1960
 Honshia Avdeev, 2017
 Humesia Avdeev, 1980
 Nanaspis Humes & Cressey, 1959
 Stephopontius Thompson & Scott, 1903

References

Copepods